The 2011 Nigerian Senate election in Zamfara State was held on April 11, 2011, to elect members of the Nigerian Senate to represent Zamfara State. Kabir Garba Marafa representing Zamfara Central won on the platform of All Nigeria Peoples Party, while Sahabi Yau representing Zamfara North and Ahmad Sani Yerima representing Zamfara West both won on the platform of the Peoples Democratic Party.

Overview

Summary

Results

Zamfara Central 
All Nigeria Peoples Party candidate Kabir Garba Marafa won the election, defeating People's Democratic Party candidate Ibrahim Shehu and other party candidates.

Zamfara North 
People's Democratic Party candidate Sahabi Alhaji Yaú won the election, defeating All Nigeria Peoples Party candidate Tijjani Yahaya Kaura and other party candidates.

Zamfara West 
People's Democratic Party candidate Ahmad Sani Yerima won the election, defeating All Nigeria Peoples Party candidate Bello Matawalle and other party candidates.

Reference 

April 2011 events in Nigeria
Zam
Zamfara State Senate elections